The 2021 Wheelchair Rugby League World Cup will feature eight international teams, with each consisting of up to a twelve-man squad.

Group A

Australia
 Peter Arbuckle (Queensland)
 Cory Cannane (New South Wales)
 Craig Cannane (New South Wales)
 Richard Engles (New South Wales)
 Brad Grove (New South Wales)
 Shaun Harre (Queensland)
 James Hill (Queensland)
 Diab Karim (New South Wales)
 Liam Luff (New South Wales)
 Bayley McKenna (Queensland)
 Zac Schumacher (Queensland)
 Adam Tannock (Queensland).

England
 Sebastien Bechara (Catalans Dragons)
 Jack Brown (Halifax Panthers)
 Wayne Boardman (Halifax Panthers)
 Nathan Collins (Leeds Rhinos)
 Joe Coyd (London Roosters)
 Rob Hawkins (Halifax Panthers)
 Tom Halliwell (Leeds Rhinos)
 Lewis King (London Roosters)
 Adam Rigby (Wigan Warriors)
 Declan Roberts (Wigan Warriors)
 James Simpson (Leeds Rhinos)

Ireland
 Toby Burton-Carter (Warrington Wolves)
 Tom Martin (Halifax Panthers)
 Rick Rodgers (Argonauts Demi-gods and Skeleton Army)
 Stephen Campbell 
 Paddy Forbes 
 Kenneth Maloney (Gravesend Dynamite)
 Scott Robertson
 Peter Johnston (Argonauts Demi-gods and Skeleton Army)
 Phil Roberts (Wigan Warriors)
 James McCarthy
 Oran Spain
 Nash Jennings

Spain
 David Berty (St Toulousain)
 Jorge Gelade-Panzo (Dragons Handi)
 Theo Gonzalez (Handisport Roannais)
 Joel lacombe (Dragons Handi)
 Yannick Martin (Montauban)
 Fabien Moisdon (Dragons Handi)
 Raphaël Monedero (Dragons Handi)
 David Raymond (Biganos)
 Wilfrid Seron (St Toulousain)

Group B

France
 Mostefa Abassi (Saint-Jory)
 Lionel Alazard (Montauban)
 Jérémy Bourson (Dragons Handi)
 Gilles Clausells (Dragons Handi)
 Nicolas Clausells (Dragons Handi)
 Dany Denuwelaere (Montauban)
 Thomas Duhalde (Euskadi)
 Florian Guttadoro (SO Avignon)
 Guillaume Mautz (SO Avignon)
 Julien Penella (Euskadi)
 Arno Vargas (Dragons Handi)
 Yann Verdi (SO Avignon). 
 Jonathan Hivernat (Dragons Handi, standby)
 Adrien Zittel (Arbent, standby).

Scotland
 Dave Anderson (West Wales Raiders)
 Gregor Anderson (Dundee Dragons)
 David Birtles (Dundee Dragons)
 Connor Blackmore (Dundee Dragons)
 Dan Grant (Gravesend)
 Paul Hartley (Glasgow RL)
 Peter Lauder (unattached)
 Michael Mellon (Dundee Dragons)
 Graeme Stewart (Glasgow RL)
 Cadyn Thompson (Dundee Dragons)
 John Willans (Dundee Dragons)
 Callum Young (Warrington Wolves)

United States
 Jeffrey Townsend (captain)
 Jesse Lind (vice-captain)
 MacKenzie Johnson
 Michah Stewart
 William Johnstone
 Lavern Anderson
 Freddie Smith
 Gabi Cha
 Andy Kingsley
 Matthew Wooloff (Wigan Warriors)
 Jabrier Lee
 Jensen Blaine

Wales
 Stephen Halsey (North Wales Crusaders)
 Scott Trigg-Turner (North Wales Crusaders)
 Gary Preece (Hereford Harriers)
 Mason Baker (North Wales Crusaders)
 Jodie Boyd-Ward (Leeds Rhinos)
 Andrew Higgins (Hereford Harriers)
 Stuart Williams (North Wales Crusaders)
 Lucie Roberts (North Wales Crusaders)
 Martin Lane (Hereford Harriers)
 Mark Williams (Wigan Warriors)
 Harry Jones (North Wales Crusaders)
 Alan Caron (Hereford Harriers).

References

2021 Rugby League World Cup
Rugby League World Cup squads